Michael Blue (born 1977/1978) is an American billionaire businessman, the managing partner and one of the co-founders of Privateer Holdings, along with Brendan Kennedy and Christian Groh.

Blue earned a bachelor's degree in finance from Harding University, and an MBA from Yale University.

According to Bloomberg LP, as of September 2018, Blue has a net worth of at least US$2.4 billion.

References

Living people
American billionaires
1970s births
Harding University alumni
Yale School of Management alumni
21st-century American businesspeople